An Idiot in Paris (French: Un idiot à Paris) is a 1967 French comedy film directed by Serge Korber and starring Dany Carrel, Jean Lefebvre and Bernard Blier.

Cast
 Dany Carrel as Juliette dite 'La fleur' 
 Jean Lefebvre as Goubi 
 Bernard Blier as Léon Dessertine 
 Robert Dalban as Patouilloux 
 Micheline Luccioni as Lucienne - une prostituée 
 Fernand Berset as Jules Grafouillères 
 Jean Carmet as Ernest Grafouillères 
 Albert Rémy as Rabichon, le restaurateur 
 Bernadette Lafont as Berthe Patouilloux 
 André Pousse as Le chauffeur de taxi 
 Paul Préboist as Le gardien du square / Square Guardian 
 Philippe Avron as François Flutiaux 
 Yves Robert as Marcel Pitou, l'évadé des HLM / Man by the Seine 
 Lucien Raimbourg as Catolle 
 Jeanne Pérez as Germaine Catolle 
 Hubert de Lapparent as Police inspector Pingeon 
 Robert Castel as Un agent de police 
 Jean-Claude Massoulier as Un inspecteur 
 Pierre Richard as L'agent de police Boudinos

References

Bibliography 
 Philippe Rège. Encyclopedia of French Film Directors, Volume 1. Scarecrow Press, 2009.

External links 
 

1967 films
French comedy films
1960s French-language films
Films directed by Serge Korber
Films set in Paris
Gaumont Film Company films
1967 comedy films
Films with screenplays by Michel Audiard
1960s French films